Vladislava Evtushenko (born May 1, 1996) is a Russian actress, dancer, model, and beauty pageant titleholder who was placed as the 1st Runner-up of Miss Russia 2015 and appointed as Miss Universe Russia 2015. She represented Russia at the Miss Universe 2015 pageant.

Early and personal life
Vladislava was born on May 1, 1996 in Chita, Zabaykalsky Krai, Russia.

Career

Miss Russia 2015
Sofia Nikitchuk was crowned Miss Russia 2015. The first “Vice-Miss” was Vladislava and the second “Vice-Miss” was Anastasia Naydenova.

Appointment
Traditionally, Miss Russia sends the winner of the Miss Russia pageant to the Miss Universe pageant. In October 2015, Vladislava was appointed as Miss Universe Russia by the Miss Russia Committee. Sofia Nikitchuk was replaced by Vladislava after Miss Universe 2015 was scheduled on December 20, 2015,  and Nikitchuk had to participate in Miss World, which took place on December 19, 2015.

Miss Universe 2015
In the Miss Universe 2015 pageant, held on 20 December 2015, Evtushenko did not place as a semi-finalist.

Other work
In 2016, she starred in the music video for Russia's 2016 Eurovision entry "You Are the Only One" by Sergey Lazarev.

References

External links
 Miss Russia official website

1996 births
Living people
Russian beauty pageant winners
People from Chita, Zabaykalsky Krai
Miss Universe 2015 contestants
Russian female models